Guido Ratto (born 8 June 1999) is an Argentine professional footballer who plays as a midfielder for Atlético Monzón.

References

External links 
 
 

1999 births
Living people
Footballers from Buenos Aires
Argentine footballers
Association football midfielders
Argentine expatriate footballers
Expatriate footballers in Spain
Expatriate footballers in Gibraltar
Expatriate footballers in Belarus
Gibraltar United F.C. players
FC Slavia Mozyr players
AE Prat players
Atlético Monzón players